The 1946 Tulane Green Wave football team represented Tulane University as a member of the Southeastern Conference (SEC) during the 1946 college football season. Led by first-year head coach Henry Frnka, the Green Wave played their home games at Tulane Stadium in New Orleans. Tulane finished the season with an overall record of 3–7 and a mark of 2–4 in conference play, placing ninth in the SEC.

Schedule

After the season
The 1947 NFL Draft was held on December 16, 1946. The following Green Wave player was selected.

References

Tulane
Tulane Green Wave football seasons
Tulane Green Wave football